John Mathew Blaska (May 14, 1885 – May 26, 1957) was a member of the Wisconsin State Assembly.

Biography
John Mathew Blaska was born on May 14, 1885 in Medina, Wisconsin. He later moved to Marshall, Dane County, Wisconsin. Blaska was a farmer and tobacco grower. He died on May 26, 1957.

One of Blaska's sons, Jerome, also served in the Assembly.

Political career
Blaska served as a Democratic member of the Assembly from 1948 to 1950. In addition, he served on the Sun Prairie Town Board, the Dane County Board of Supervisors, and the county highway committee.

References

See also
The Political Graveyard

Farmers from Wisconsin
Wisconsin city council members
County supervisors in Wisconsin
Democratic Party members of the Wisconsin State Assembly
1885 births
1957 deaths
20th-century American politicians
Burials in Wisconsin
People from Marshall, Dane County, Wisconsin
People from Medina (town), Wisconsin